The January 2015 raid on Kolofata was an unsuccessful assault on a Cameroonian military base at Kolofata, Far North Region, perpetrated by Boko Haram. The incident occurred on 12 January 2015 coming shortly after another Boko Haram incursion onto Cameroonian soil.

Background
During 2014, Boko Haram militants conducted a number of attacks on villages located within northern Cameroon, killing at least 40 government soldiers and recruiting hundreds of people into the organization.
The largest such operation took place between 28 and 29 December 2014, and included simultaneous raids that targeted both civilians and military, causing a total of 84 fatalities.

Raid
On 12 January 2015, Boko Haram militants carried out an assault on a Cameroonian army encampment outside the city of Kolofata, Far North Region. The Cameroonian military successfully repelled the attack, killing between 200 - 300 insurgents and seizing large quantities of weaponry and ammunition, one Cameroonian officer was also killed in action.

References

Attacks in Nigeria in 2015
Boko Haram in Cameroon
Massacres in Cameroon
Conflicts in 2015
Terrorist incidents in Cameroon in 2015
January 2015 events in Africa